Texas Lightning is a German quintet from Hamburg which fits in the country music genre and describes itself as old fashioned and hip.  Their music is a mix of country and pop drawing from country classic stars like Patsy Cline, Loretta Lynn, Johnny Cash and Tammy Wynette and pop stars such as ABBA, Nancy Sinatra, Linda Ronstadt, Madonna, Michael Jackson and the Beatles, performed with some country humour. The band members are Olli Dittrich as Ringofire (drums and vocals), Jon Flemming Olsen as The Flame (vocals and guitar), Markus Schmidt as Fastfinger (electric guitar and banjo), Uwe Frenzel as Friendly (doublebass and vocals) and Australian Jane Comerford (vocals and ukulele). The band's first performance took place on December 23, 2000, in the music club "Knust" in Hamburg, as Texas Lightning & The Rodeo Rockets, although there have been various changes in the lineup of the band since.

Eurovision Song Contest
On March 9, 2006, Texas Lightning won the German heat for the Eurovision Song Contest 2006 and represented Germany in the Finals on May 20, 2006, in Athens, Greece.  The winning song was "No No Never", written and composed by Jane Comerford. They became the first country band to participate in the ESC.  The song finished 14th place with 36 points.

"No No Never" was released as a single in Germany, Austria and Switzerland.  It reached number 1 on the German Media Control Charts, number 4 in Austria and number 6 in Switzerland.

Honorary Texas Citizenship 
Through a nomination by Steve Sivek of Baytown, Texas and the submittal by Texas State Senator Tommy Williams, the members of Texas Lightning were, by Proclamation 603 before the Texas Senate, declared to be Honorary Texans. The proclamation was passed by the senate in June 2006.

Discography

Album 
2006 "Meanwhile, Back at the Ranch" (Gold Status)
2009 "Western Bound"

Singles 
2005 "Like a Virgin"
2006 "No No Never" (Platinum Status)
2006 "I Promise"
2009 "Seven Ways to Heaven"

References

External links 

 Texas Lightning website in German and English

German country music groups
Eurovision Song Contest entrants for Germany
Eurovision Song Contest entrants of 2006
Musical groups from Hamburg
Culture in Hamburg